In 2005, the Campeonato Brasileiro Série C was composed of five rounds. In the first one, the 64 teams were divided in 16 groups of 4 teams each. Teams in each group played against each other in home and away games. The two best ranked teams of each group advanced to the second round, where they were paired 2-by-2 and played home and away games. The 32 teams played such rounds until there were just four teams left. The four eventual finalists were put in a single group, and played against each other in home and away games. América (RN) and Remo (PA) were promoted to the Série B, beating Novo Hamburgo (RS) and Ipatinga (MG).

Participating teams

Stages of the competition

First stage
Group 1 (AC-AM)

Group 2 (MT-PA-RO)

Group 3 (AP-PA-RR)

Group 4 (MA-PI-TO)

Group 5 (CE-PE-PI)

Group 6 (AL-PB-PE-RN)

Group 7 (AL-PB-RN)

Group 8 (BA-SE)

Group 9 (ES-MG-RJ)

Group 10 (RJ-SP)

Group 11 (MS-PR)

Group 12 (DF-GO)

Group 13 (MG-SP)

Group 14 (MG-RJ)

Group 15 (PR-RS-SC)

Group 16 (RS-SC)

Second stage
In bold, the clubs qualified to the next stage.

América (RN) - Ferroviário (CE) 2-1 3-3
Serra (ES) - Atlético Sorocaba (SP) 4-3 1-2
CENE (MS) - Ceilândia (DF) 1-2 1-1
Volta Redonda (RJ) - Rio Branco (SP) 2-1 0-1
Independência (AC) - Vila Aurora (MT) 2-1 1-3
Tocantinópolis (TO) - Remo (PA) 2-0 1-4
Abaeté (PA) - Moto Club (MA) 1-0 0-1 (pen 5-4) 
Icasa (CE) - Coruripe (AL) 1-0 2-6
Itabaiana (SE) - Treze (PB) 1-1 0-4
ABC (RN) - Sergipe (SE) 3-2 0-0
Mogi Mirim (SP) - Ipatinga (MG) 2-2 2-2 (pen 2-4)
Paranoá (DF) - Londrina (PR) 1-0 0-1 (pen 3-4)
Ituiutaba (MG) - Villa Nova (MG) 1-3 0-3
Gaúcho (RS) - Novo Hamburgo (RS) 0-0 1-3
Joinville (SC) - Glória (RS) 3-1 0-0
São Raimundo (PA) - Nacional (AM) 2-2 1-4

Third stage
In bold, the clubs qualified to the next stage.Vila Aurora (MT) - Nacional (AM) 4-3 2-3Villa Nova (MG) - Rio Branco (SP) 1-0 5-2Remo (PA) - Abaeté (PA) 1-1 3-2
Coruripe (AL) - América (RN) 1-1 1-3
ABC (RN) - Treze (PB) 1-0 0-1 (pen 4-5)Ipatinga (MG) - Atlético Sorocaba (SP)  2-0 4-1Ceilândia (DF) - Londrina (PR) 3-0 1-0Novo Hamburgo (RS) - Joinville (SC) 1-0 0-1 (pen 4-3)

Quarterfinals
In bold', the clubs qualified to the next stage.

Final stage

External links
2005 Campeonato Brasileiro Série C at RSSSF

3
Campeonato Brasileiro Série C seasons